A list of Roman villas in England confirmed by archaeology.

Bedfordshire

Berkshire

Buckinghamshire

Cambridgeshire

Cheshire

Cornwall

Derbyshire

Devon

Dorset

Essex

Gloucestershire

Greater London

Hampshire

Herefordshire

Hertfordshire

Isle of Wight

Kent

Leicestershire

Lincolnshire

Norfolk

Northamptonshire

Nottinghamshire

Oxfordshire

Rutland

Shropshire

Somerset

Staffordshire

Suffolk

Surrey

Sussex

East Sussex

West Sussex

Warwickshire

Wiltshire

Worcestershire

Yorkshire

East Riding of Yorkshire

North Yorkshire

South Yorkshire

West Yorkshire

See also
List of Roman villas in Wales

References

 
Villas, England
Roman villas
Villas in England